Pelagerythrobacter aerophilus  is a Gram-negative and rod-shaped bacterium from the genus Pelagerythrobacter which has been isolated from deep-sea seawater from the Mariana Trench.

References 

Sphingomonadales
Bacteria described in 2019